Mesmont is a commune in the Côte-d'Or department of eastern France.

Population

See also
Communes of the Côte-d'Or department

References

Communes of Côte-d'Or